The Petrograd Metropolis electoral district was a constituency created for the 1917 Russian Constituent Assembly election. Petrograd city constituted an electoral district of its own, separate from the rest of the Petrograd Governorate. Voter turnout in the capital was estimated at between 69.7% and 72%.

Parties in the fray

Socialist-Revolutionaries
The Petrograd SR branch was dominated by left-wing and centrist elements.

Kadets
The Kadet list (no. 2) was headed by Pavel Milyukov, followed by Maxim Vinaver, Nikolai Kutler, F.I. Rodichev, Vladimir Dmitrievich Nabokov, Andrei Ivanovich Shingarev, Countess Sofia Panina, Aleksandr Kornilov, D.D. Grimm, D.S. Zernov, Vladimir Vernadsky, A.N. Kolosov, A.D. Protopopov, Prince V.A. Obolensky, Sergey Oldenburg, L.A. Velikhov, K. N. Sokolov and V. M. Hessen.

Bolsheviks
The Bolshevik (no. 4) Bolsheviks headed by Vladimir Ilich Ulyanov (Lenin), followed by Evsei Aronovich Radomyslsky (Zinoviev), Lev Davydovich Bronstein (Trotsky), Lev Borisovich Rosenfeld (Kamenev), Alexandra Kollontai, Iosif Vissarionovich Dzhugashvili (Stalin), Matvei Muranov, Mikhail Kalinin, Józef Unszlicht, Sergei Alexandrovich Cherepanov, Grigorii Eremeevich Evdokimov, Klavdia Ivanovna Nikolaeva and others.

Others
There was also List 13, the Women's Union for the Motherland. This organization had been formed in Petrograd in June 1917, and had called Russian women to form "Death Battalions" and join the soldiers at the front.

Results

Ballots and campaign materials

References

1910s in Saint Petersburg
Electoral districts of the Russian Constituent Assembly election, 1917